Francesco Rosetta (9 October 1922 – 8 December 2006) was an Italian footballer who played as a defender. He represented the Italy national football team seven times, the first being on 22 May 1949, the occasion of a 1948–53 Central European International Cup match against Austria in a 3–1 home win.

Honours

Player
Torino
Serie A: 1946–47

Fiorentina
Serie A: 1955–56

References

1922 births
2006 deaths
Italian footballers
Italy international footballers
Association football defenders
Novara F.C. players
Torino F.C. players
ACF Fiorentina players
Hellas Verona F.C. players